Amine Noua (born February 7, 1997) is a French professional basketball player for ASVEL of the French LNB Pro A and the EuroLeague. Standing at 2.02 m (6 ft 8 in), he plays power forward.

Professional career 
Noua was born in Lyon and cut his teeth in the youth ranks of ASVEL Basket. After playing in the club’s under-21 team, he made his first-team debut in January 2016, scoring two points in five minutes against Champagne Châlons-Reims Basket. During ASVEL’s championship run that year, he averaged 0.8 points and 0.8 rebounds in 3.8 minutes per contest.

In April 2018, he declared for the 2018 NBA draft. However, he withdrew before the deadline. His breakout season came in 2017-18, when he averaged 11 points and 4.7 rebounds a game in 32 ProA contests (including 26 starts). He also attended the French All Star Game that season.

On July 7, 2021, he has signed with MoraBanc Andorra of the Liga ACB.

On April 11, 2022, he has signed with SIG Strasbourg of the French LNB Pro A. He returned to ASVEL on July 7, 2022.

International career 
Noua was part of the French national team, competing in the 2013 FIBA Europe Under-16 Championships. At the 2014 FIBA Under-17 World Championships, he poured in 18.7 points a contest, finishing fourth in the tournament in scoring en route to Eurobasket.com All-World Championships U17 3rd Team distinction. Noua averaged 15.8 points per game at the 2016 FIBA Europe under-20 Championships.

During the 2017 FIBA Europe Under-20 Championship, he averaged team-highs 12.9 points as well as 7.9 rebounds a game, helping France win the bronze medal and was named to the All-Tournament Team. In November 2017, he received his first call-up for the men's national team.

External links 
 LNB profile
 FIBA profile
 Eurobasket.com profile

References 

1997 births
Living people
ASVEL Basket players
BC Andorra players
Expatriate basketball people in Andorra
French men's basketball players
Liga ACB players
People from Vénissieux
Power forwards (basketball)
SIG Basket players
Sportspeople from Lyon Metropolis